Sirkka Namutenya Anneli Mwahafa Ausiku (born 1964) is a Namibian administrator and politician. She is the governor of Kavango West Region since 2014.

Ausiku was born on 9 April 1964 in Nkurenkuru in the Kavango West Region. She holds a diploma in Higher Education as well as a BA degree from the University of the Western Cape, and a Master's degree in Public Policy and Administration from the University of Namibia. She has worked as teacher at Kandjimi Murangi Secondary School, as an education administrator, and as a permanent secretary in the Namibian government.

Ausiku holds the Most Excellent Order of the Eagle, Second Class.

Governor
President Pohamba announced Ausiku's nomination as governor of the newly created Kavango West region at a SWAPO Party Central Committee meeting. Prior to her appointment, she was the Permanent Secretary in the Namibian Ministry of Gender Equality and later the Ministry of Regional and Local Government, Housing and Rural Development.

During her tenure, Kavango's council completed constituency offices at Mpungu and Ncamagoro and established a regional government office complex in Nkurenkuru.

References

1964 births
Living people
SWAPO politicians
People from Kavango West